Cherno (Cyrillic: Черно; Russian for "black") is the debut studio album by Finnish doom metal band KYPCK, released on 12 March 2008 by UHO Production.

Track listing

Personnel 
E. Seppänen – vocals
S. S. Lopakka – guitar
J. T. Ylä-Rautio – bass
K. H. M. Hiilesmaa – drums

References 

2008 albums
Century Media Records albums
KYPCK albums